Puerto Rico competed at the 2022 Winter Olympics in Beijing, China, from 4 to 20 February 2022.

The Puerto Rican team consists of two athletes (one male and one female) competing in two sports. Skeleton racer Kellie Delka and alpine skier William Flaherty were named as the Puerto Rican flagbearers during the opening ceremony. Meanwhile Delka was the flagbearer during the closing ceremony.

Competitors
The following is the list of number of competitors participating at the Games per sport/discipline.

Alpine skiing

By meeting the basic qualification standards, Puerto Rico qualified one male alpine skier.

Men

Skeleton 

Based on the world rankings, Puerto Rico qualified 1 sled in the women's event. This marked the country's debut in the sport at the Winter Olympics.

See also
Tropical nations at the Winter Olympics

References

Nations at the 2022 Winter Olympics
2022
Winter Olympics